is an electronics company that manufactures loudspeakers and audio equipment for other companies or sells them under the trade name Fostex. It is traded on the Tokyo Stock Exchange.

Overview 
Foster Denki supplies audio equipment as an OEM:

speakers and headphones for Sennheiser, Sony, Yamaha, Denon, Nokia and Beats
earphones for Apple's iPod and iPhone
 television speakers for the Toshiba REGZA television brand
in-vehicle speakers for Clarion, Mitsubishi Motors, Honda, GM, Ford, Mercedes-Benz and others

History
Foster Denki was founded in 1948 and became one of the largest OEM manufacturer of loudspeakers and transducer products worldwide. Fostex was then established in June 1973 to brand components manufactured by Foster Electric.

In 1978, Fostex  started to develop speakers for professional use, becoming very well known in both consumer hi-fi and professional fields. Fostex 6301B was the company's most small powered monitor speaker for broadcast and professional use.

1980s: Analog multitrack recorders 

From 1981, Fostex and TASCAM pioneered affordable multitrack recording equipment producing the A-2 and the A-4 reel-to-reel recorders; the A-8 was the first eight-track recorder that used affordable ¼ inch tape, becoming a popular choice in the freelance and home recording field.

Another popular product was the Fostex 250 four-track cassette multitracker: it used standard cassettes running at double speed (3¾ ips), which improved high frequency response and dynamic range. To obtain four tracks from a standard cassette, all the four tracks available were used in one direction (normally, two tracks are used in each direction). Dolby C noise reduction was used.

In 1983, Fostex released the X-15, a portable, battery-powered, cassette-based four track recorder and the B-16, a very compact recorder which fitted 16 tracks onto ½ inch tape running at 15 ips speed. Dolby C was built into the machine as an option to overcome the technical limitations due to the narrow track format.

The B-16 was followed by the E-16 in 1986 and the G-16S in 1990, being the first recorder implementing the Dolby S noise reduction system. The G-24S was the last analogue multitrack machine, which fitted 24 tracks onto 1 inch tape and included built-in SMPTE/MIDI synchronization and a removable front panel remote control and meter bridge.

1990s: Digital multitrack recorders 

As digital technology progressed in the audio field, Fostex moved from analogue tape-based recorders to digital, drive-based recorders.

The Fostex DMT-8, released in 1995, was the first portable and affordable digital recorder. It provided eight tracks of 16-bit, 44.1kHz audio recorded to hard disk, non-destructive editing capabilities, a built-in metronome and MIDI clock output for synchronization with other machines. The FD-4 and FD-8 were variants which added support for Zip and SyQuest removable drives.

Present 

Fostex's current product range includes digital multitrack recording equipment, loudspeaker drivers, studio monitors, microphones, and headphones.

Some production sound mixers for motion pictures use the Fostex Field Memory Recorder (FR-series and PD-series), which records audio and stores recordings as WAV files, as their recording device for sync sound.

Fostex has expanded its offering of hi-fi based products to include high-end headphones (TH-series), digital audio converters (HP series) and devices for portable listing. Fostex's T50RP model has become popular in headphone modification circles.

References

Top Headset Reviews and buying guides: Headset Reviews.

Further reading

External links 
 Official international website
 Fostex D-160 Sound On Sound review (archive.org)
 Fostex D-90 Sound On Sound review (archive.org)
 Fostex CDR200 Sound On Sound review (archive.org)
 Fostex FD8 Sound On Sound review (archive.org)

Audio equipment manufacturers of Japan
Loudspeaker manufacturers
Headphones manufacturers
Manufacturing companies based in Tokyo
Japanese brands
Electronics companies established in 1973
1973 establishments in Japan